Northborough may refer to:

Northborough, Cambridgeshire, a village and civil parish in Cambridgeshire, England
Northborough, Massachusetts, a town in Worcester County, Massachusetts, United States
Northborough (CDP), Massachusetts, a census-designated place in Northborough, Massachusetts
Northborough, Slough, an area of Slough in Berkshire, England (List of places in Berkshire)